The 2014 Southland Conference men's basketball tournament, a part of the 2013–14 NCAA Division I men's basketball season, took place March 12–15 at the Merrell Center in Katy, Texas. The winner of the tournament received the Southland Conference's automatic bid to the 2014 NCAA tournament.

Bracket
Source:

References

Southland Conference men's basketball tournament
2013–14 Southland Conference men's basketball season
Southland Conference men's basketball
Southland Conference men's basketball tournament
Sports competitions in Katy, Texas
College basketball tournaments in Texas